Alberto João Augusto (born 31 July 1898 in Lisbon - died 1973) was a Portuguese footballer who played as forward.

His brother, Artur Augusto, was also a Portugal international footballer.

Alberto Augusto was the first ever scorer for Portugal, scoring their only goal in a 3-1 loss to Spain.

References

Further reading

External links 
 
 
Alberto Augusto at Glórias do Passado

1898 births
1973 deaths
Footballers from Lisbon
Portuguese footballers
Association football forwards
Primeira Liga players
S.L. Benfica footballers
S.C. Braga players
S.C. Salgueiros players
Vitória S.C. players
America Football Club (RJ) players
Portugal international footballers